Leonid Polterovich (born 30 August 1963) is a Russian-Israeli mathematician at Tel Aviv University. His research field includes symplectic geometry and dynamical systems.

A native of Moscow, Polterovich earned his undergraduate degree at Moscow State University in 1984. He moved to Israel after the collapse of communism, earning his doctorate from Tel Aviv University in 1990. In 1996, he was awarded the EMS Prize, and in 1998 the Erdős Prize. In 1998, he was an Invited Speaker of the International Congress of Mathematicians in Berlin. He was a member of the faculty of the University of Chicago.

References

External links
Website at Tel Aviv University

1963 births
Living people
Russian Jews
Mathematicians from Moscow
Israeli mathematicians
Israeli people of Russian-Jewish descent
Moscow State University alumni
Tel Aviv University alumni
University of Chicago faculty
Russian emigrants to Israel
Erdős Prize recipients